Sefako Mapogo Makgatho (1861 - 23 May 1951) was born at GaMphahlele, in the Pietersburg district in Transvaal (now Limpopo). He was the son of Chief Kgorutlhe Josiah Makgatho of the Makgatho chieftaincy at GaMphahlele.

Before embarking on a political career, Makgato was a teacher and a journalist. Makgatho joined the South African Native National Congress (SANNC) later renamed the African National Congresss (ANC). He became its president at the tail end of World War I, in 1917.

As President of the SANNC, Makgatho worked hard to ensure that the movement remained a key factor in the struggle against segregation. It was during Makgatho’s presidency that the ANC is thought to have become radicalized. In 1917 and 1920 Makgatho ensured that the ANC supported the municipal workers strike and the miners’ strike in Johannesburg.

In 1923 he was forced to step down and was replaced by Z. K. Mahabane. Makgatho remained President of the Transvaal ANC until the mid 1930s and continued to exert considerable influence in the movement.

He died on 23 May 1951 aged 90; the same year, Nelson Mandela's son from his first marriage with his wife Evelyn was born. In paying tribute to Sefako Makgatho, Mandela named his son after him.

Legacy 
Sefako Makgatho Health Sciences University was named after him. Makgatho was posthumously awarded the Order of Luthuli by the South African government.

References

Further reading 

Sonderling, N.E. (ed.) New Dictionary of South African Biography, v. 2.

1861 births
1951 deaths
People from Lepelle-Nkumpi Local Municipality
South African Republic people
Northern Sotho people
Presidents of the African National Congress
Members of the Order of Luthuli